The 2019 Northern Illinois Huskies football team represented Northern Illinois University as a member of the West Division of the Mid-American Conference (MAC) during the 2019 NCAA Division I FBS football season. Led by first-year head coach Thomas Hammock the Huskies compiled an overall record of 5–7 with a mark of 4–4 in conference play, tying for third place in the MAC"s West Division. The team played home games at Huskie Stadium in DeKalb, Illinois.

Previous season
The Huskies finished the 2018 season 8–6, 6–2 to win the West Division. In the MAC Championship game, they defeated Buffalo. The received a bid to the Boca Raton Bowl, where they lost to UAB.

Offseason

Coaching changes
On January 11, 2019, head coach Rod Carey accepted the head coach position at Temple. On January 18, the school hired NIU alum and Baltimore Ravens assistant coach  Thomas Hammock as the new head coach. Hammock was a star running back for the Huskies from 1999 to 2002.

On January 25, Hammock announced the hiring of Eric Eidsness, the offensive coordinator for South Dakota State, to the same position. On February 11, Derrick Jackson was announced as the new defensive coordinator. Jackson had spent the previous two seasons as cornerbacks coach and defensive recruiting coordinator at Purdue.

Preseason

MAC media poll
The MAC released their preseason media poll on July 23, 2019, with the Huskies predicted to finish in third place in the West Division.

Schedule

Game summaries

Illinois State

at Utah

at Nebraska

at Vanderbilt

Ball State

at Ohio

at Miami (OH)

Akron

at Central Michigan

at Toledo

Eastern Michigan

Western Michigan

References

Northern Illinois
Northern Illinois Huskies football seasons
Northern Illinois Huskies football